"La Violetera" is a 1914 cuplé song, with the rhythm of a habanera, composed by José Padilla and with lyrics by Eduardo Montesinos, originally performed by Carmen Flores and popularized by Raquel Meller first and by Sara Montiel later. The instrumental version is also popular as a tango. In Spanish, a Violetera is a woman who sells violets.

History
The song was composed in 1914 by José Padilla during his stay in Paris as director of the orchestra of the Casino de Paris music hall. The lyricist was Eduardo Montesinos. Its premiere took place in Barcelona with a performance by Carmen Flores. It was singer Raquel Meller who popularized the song in Spain and France first, and worldwide later.

Sung in French by Dalida, it was released in 1956 in the first high quality release of the song on vinyl. It was included on her 1956 EP La violetera / Le torrent / Gitane / Fado that reached #10 on 1956 French charts and remained there for 14 weeks. It was included also on her first album Son nom est Dalida in 1957.

The 1958 blockbuster musical film The Violet Seller, by Luis César Amadori, was inspired by the song. The version of "La Violetera" performed by Sara Montiel in the film, with arrangement by composer Gregorio García Segura and recorded by Hispavox, also became worldwide famous. The film soundtrack was released in different vinyl editions in Spain, Italy, Portugal, France, Greece, Israel, Japan, Chile, Argentina, Colombia, Bolivia, Peru, Brazil, Mexico, Canada and the United States. It received a Gold Record award for the number of records sold.

The song is also in the repertoire of singers such as Montserrat Caballé, Gigliola Cinquetti, Nana Mouskouri, Connie Francis and Mieczysław Fogg.

Other films using "La Violetera" in its soundtrack include City Lights (1931) by Charles Chaplin with himself and Virginia Cherrill; All Night Long (1981) by Jean-Claude Tramont with Barbra Streisand and Gene Hackman; Scent of a Woman (1992) by Martin Brest with Al Pacino and Chris O'Donnell; In the Mood for Love (2000) by Wong Kar Wai, named "Lan Hua Nu", recorded in 1949 and sung by Rebecca Pan; and Rajee En Kanmani (1954), named "Malligai Poo Jathi Rojaa", mixed with "La Paloma" and sung by R. Balasaraswathi Devi.

Plagiarism and adaptations

In 1926 Anselmo Aieta wrote a tango to lyrics by Francisco García Jiménez, where the refrain is a straight borrowing of "La Violetera"'s theme.

Among the most famous adaptations is the one by Charles Chaplin in his 1931 film City Lights. The main theme used as a leitmotif for the blind flower-seller is the song "La Violetera" ("Who’ll Buy my Violets"). Chaplin was unable to secure the song performer, Raquel Meller, in the lead role, but used the song melody anyway as a major theme. In 1934, Chaplin lost a lawsuit to Padilla (which took place in Paris, where Padilla then lived) for not crediting him. Some modern editions released for video include a new recording by Carl Davis.

Depictions
In 1966, a fountain commemorating singer Raquel Meller, portrayed as a violets seller, was unveiled in Barcelona. In 1991, a statue of a violets seller, named La Violetera, by sculptor Santiago de Santiago, commemorating composer José Padilla, was unveiled in Madrid. Since 2003, the statue is located at Las Vistillas gardens in Madrid.

References

External links
 La Violetera (song) at the Internet Archive
 History of 'La Violetera’ on spainisculture.com

1914 songs
Spanish music
Spanish songs
Film music